"Wait for It" is the first episode in the third season of the television series How I Met Your Mother and 45th episode overall. It originally aired on September 24, 2007.

Plot
Future Ted tells his children that although they know the short story (involving a yellow umbrella) of how he met their mother, there is a bigger story of how he became the man he needed to be in order to meet her.

At Lily and Marshall's wedding, Barney tries to get Ted out to help him "conquer New York" but Ted says he is not ready yet. Robin returns from Argentina with her new boyfriend Gael (played by Enrique Iglesias) and Ted announces he's finally ready, having decided that Robin is trying to “win” their breakup. Marshall backs up this theory by explaining to Lily about the winner and loser in each break-up, so Barney takes Ted out to help him win by getting Ted "a 12" (compared to Ted’s admission that Robin is "a 10"), but Ted gets "a 12" on his own, a tattooed girl named Amy (guest star Mandy Moore).

Meanwhile, Lily and Marshall are having a night in with Robin and Gael after Lily inadvertently asks Gael out on a double date. They are supposed to be supporting Ted by hating Gael, but both end up falling for Gael as he plays the acoustic guitar, gives massages and sensually feeds fruit to everyone else.

On the night out with Ted, Barney clashes with Amy about everything and insists that he should be helping Ted as he is his wingman but Ted is solely interested in Amy. Ted decides to get a tattoo, but blacks out shortly after. The following morning, Lily and Marshall spot a butterfly tattoo on Ted's lower back and call Barney to come and see it.

Lily and Marshall explain what happened in the apartment the night before, which annoys Ted who goes to see Robin and accuses her of being over their break-up too fast. She reveals she cried for three days at the start of her vacation about missing Ted, which led her to Gael. Ted is still upset that Gael is so attractive, but Robin tells Ted that he has a bigger penis than Gael, which leads Ted to tell the guys at the bar that he has won the break-up.

In the epilogue, Barney is terrified upon seeing a countdown clock at roughly 55 days until Marshall is to give him the third slap in their Slap Bet.

Critical response

Donna Bowman of The A.V. Club rated the episode B+.

Staci Krause of IGN gave the episode 8.7 out of 10.

Joel Keller of TV Squad originally said Moore "doesn't pull [her hard-ass role] off", although later said that she wasn't too bad.

References

External links

How I Met Your Mother (season 3) episodes
2007 American television episodes